Tachymenes is a small (3 species currently recognized) Afrotropical genus of potter wasps restricted to Southern Africa.

References

Biological pest control wasps
Potter wasps